Beulah Koale is a New Zealand actor best known for portraying Officer Junior Reigns in CBS reboot series Hawaii Five-0.

Early life
Koale was born at Middlemore Hospital in Auckland, and was raised in the nearby suburb of Otara.

Koale was raised within a religious family and regularly performed in church productions.

Career
Koale joined the theatre company, Massive Company. During his time working with Massive, Beulah has performed in acclaimed shows Havoc in the Garden in 2011, and The Brave in 2012.

In 2010, Koale starred in the award-winning short film Manurewa, which screened at both the Melbourne and Berlin film festivals; and subsequently won the Crystal Bear for best short in the youth section at Berlin.

Koale stars in the sci-fi thriller Dual alongside Karen Gillan and Aaron Paul, which is filmed entirely in Tampere, Finland.

Personal life
Koale is the oldest of six siblings, having four younger brothers and a younger sister. He has twin sons with his girlfriend Georgia Otene, whom he later married in January 2019 in his hometown. Koale has said that his favourite film is The Lion King. He has multiple idols, including Cliff Curtis and Denzel Washington.

Filmography

Film

Television

Theater

Awards and nominations

References

External links
 

1992 births
Living people
New Zealand male television actors
New Zealand male film actors
New Zealand people of Samoan descent
21st-century New Zealand male actors
People from Auckland
Actors of Samoan descent